Vanda Scaravelli (1908 - 1999) is  known for her contribution to the practice of yoga in the West. She learnt yoga as an early student of two of Tirumalai Krishnamacharya's pupils, B. K. S. Iyengar who taught her the asanas, and T. K. V. Desikachar who taught her pranayama (yoga breathing). Her style of yoga was developed with the help of her long-term students, the yoga teachers Diane Long and Esther Myers, who continued the evolution of Vanda's non-lineage yoga. Scaravelli asked her followers not to name any school of yoga after her; this has not prevented some yoga teachers from claiming to teach "Scaravelli-inspired yoga".

Life

Vanda Scaravelli was born in Florence in 1908. Her father, Alberto Passigli, was involved in creating the Maggio Musicale Fiorentino as well as the Orchestra Stabile which enabled Florence to have its own orchestra. Her mother, Clara Corsi,  was a teacher and one of the first women to graduate from a university in Italy. She maintained her involvement in music throughout her life. The family home functioned as a salon for famous artists and musicians. World class musicians such as Pablo Casals, Andres Segovia and Arturo Toscanini were frequent visitors to the family villa, Il Leccio.

As a young girl, Vanda met the philosopher Krishnamurti, who became a family friend. He stayed at their home in Florence each year. Krishnamurti and the violinist Yehudi Menuhin, another friend of the family, invited the pioneer of modern yoga Tirumalai Krishnamacharya to come to Scaravelli's home in Gstaad, Switzerland to teach them yoga. Krishnamacharya sent two of his students, B. K. S. Iyengar and T. K. V. Desikachar, to teach them. Iyengar taught her the asanas, and Desikachar taught her the awareness of the breath. In this way she took up the practice of yoga in her 50s. When they left Europe she no longer had a teacher, and had to develop her own practice. As this progressed, she developed a focus on breath, gravity and the spine.

Her daughter, Paola Scaravelli Cohen, has updated her book from Scaravelli's notes.

Publications

Legacy 

Her book Awakening the Spine was called a classic by Yoga Journal.
Scaravelli-style yoga, inspired by her work and that of her student for 23 years Diane Long, continues to be taught into the 21st century, by teachers such as Esther Myers in Toronto.

Scaravelli asked her followers not to name any school of yoga after her. The yoga scholar Theo Wildcroft notes that this has not prevented yoga teachers from running sessions described as "Scaravelli-inspired yoga".

See also 

 Angela Farmer, another post-lineage yoga teacher who has avoided having schools of yoga named after her

Notelist

References

Further reading

 

Women yogis
1908 births
1999 deaths
Modern yoga pioneers